Tommaso Salvatore "Tom" Parrinello (born 11 November 1989) is an English former football defender of Italian descent who is currently Lead Professional Development Phase Coach at Bristol Rovers.

Career
Parrinello made his debut for the Bristol Rovers first team on 1 December 2007, when he appeared in an FA Cup second round match against Rushden & Diamonds, coming on as a substitute for Craig Disley.

He was the youngest of the five scholars to be offered a professional contract in the summer of 2006.
As a sixteen-year-old, he made a number of reserve team appearances in 2005/06 and was a regular in the reserve side in 2006/07 and 2007/08.

Parrinello joined Weston-super-Mare on loan in December 2008 in order to gain some first team experience, but the move became permanent two months later.

He joined Gloucester City in the summer of 2010 and was as an almost ever-present for the 2010/11 season.

In 2011/12 season he joined Mangotsfield Utd.

He is currently the Lead Professional Development Phase Coach at Bristol Rovers having previously held other coaching roles within the Academy.

References

External links

Tom Parrinello Staff profile on bristolrovers.co.uk

1989 births
Living people
English people of Italian descent
English footballers
Association football defenders
Gloucester City A.F.C. players
Bristol Rovers F.C. players
Weston-super-Mare A.F.C. players
Bristol Rovers F.C. non-playing staff